Charles Smith Rutherford  (9 February 1892 – 11 June 1989) was a Canadian recipient of the Victoria Cross, the highest and most prestigious award for gallantry in the face of the enemy that can be awarded to British and Commonwealth forces.

Early years
Rutherford was born on a farm in Colborne, Ontario on 9 January 1892. He joined The Queen's Own Rifles of Canada in 1916 and was posted to the 5th Battalion, Canadian Mounted Rifles, CEF.

World War I
He began his service in the ranks, and as a sergeant was awarded the Military Medal on 23 February 1918. After being commissioned, he was also awarded the Military Cross, the full citation was not published until after that of his VC, in a supplement to the London Gazette of 10 January 1919 (dated 11 January 1919):

Rutherford was 26 years old serving in the 4th Battle of the Scarpe near Monchy, France, when he was awarded the Victoria Cross. On 26 August 1918, while commanding an assaulting party, he found himself a considerable distance ahead of his men and at the same moment saw a fully armed strong enemy party outside a pill-box in front of him. By masterly bluff, he managed to persuade the enemy that they were surrounded and the whole party of 45, including two officers and three machine-guns, surrendered. The lieutenant then observed that gunfire from another pill-box was holding up the assault, so with a Lewis gun section he attacked it capturing another 35 prisoners and their guns. The full citation was published in a supplement to the London Gazette of 12 November 1918 (dated 15 November 1918):

He later achieved the rank of captain.

Post World War I
From 1934 to 1940, Rutherford was the Sergeant at Arms of the Ontario Legislature when Mitchell Hepburn was Premier. He was the first sergeant to eject a member of the Legislature.

During World War II he served with the Veterans Guard of Canada, reaching the rank of Captain.

C.S. Rutherford was the last recipient of the Victoria Cross from World War I to die, on 11 June 1989 at the age of 97. He is buried at The Union Cemetery, Colborne, Ontario, Canada.

The location of Rutherford's medals is not public knowledge.

References

External links

 Charles S. Rutherford's digitized service file
Charles S. Rutherford biography on DHH

1892 births
1989 deaths
Canadian World War I recipients of the Victoria Cross
Canadian recipients of the Military Medal
Canadian recipients of the Military Cross
Canadian Expeditionary Force officers
People from Northumberland County, Ontario
Queen's Own Rifles of Canada officers
Queen's Own Rifles of Canada soldiers
Canadian military personnel of World War I
Canadian military personnel from Ontario